Markham—Stouffville is a provincial electoral district in Ontario. It encompasses a portion of Ontario formerly included in the electoral districts of Markham—Unionville (provincial electoral district) and Oak Ridges—Markham (provincial electoral district).

The boundaries of the provincial riding of Markham—Stouffville are identical with those of the new federal riding of Markham—Stouffville, created by the 2012 federal electoral boundaries redistribution. The provincial redistribution came into effect upon the call of the 42nd Ontario provincial election in June 2018.

The territory of the new riding (map) consists of part of the Regional Municipality of York: (a) the Town of Whitchurch–Stouffville; and (b) the part of the City of Markham lying easterly of a line described as follows: commencing at the intersection of the northerly limit of Markham with Highway 48; then southerly along Highway 48 to 16th Avenue; then westerly to McCowan Road; then southerly to Highway 407; then easterly along Highway 407 to the Rouge River; then generally southeasterly along Rouge River to the southerly limit of Markham. The riding's population is estimated at 109,780.

Demographics
According to the Canada 2011 Census; 2013 representation

Ethnic groups: 53.8% White, 16.4% Chinese, 15.3% South Asian, 3.8% Black, 3.7% Filipino 
Languages: 63.7% English, 12.9% Chinese, 3.9% Tamil, 2.5% Italian, 1.8% Tagalog, 1.6% Urdu, 1.4% French, 1.1% Greek, 1.0% Gujarati
Religions: 60.9% Christian (27.9% Catholic, 6.2% Anglican, 5.5% United Church, 4.8% Christian Orthodox, 2.4% Baptist, 2.2% Presbyterian, 1.5% Pentecostal, 10.5% Other), 8.0% Hindu, 4.9% Muslim, 1.8% Buddhist, 22.6% No religion 
Median income (2010): $36,258 
Average income (2010): $48,199

Members of Provincial Parliament

Election results

References

External links
Map of riding for 2018 election

Ontario provincial electoral districts
Politics of Markham, Ontario
Whitchurch-Stouffville